The Légall Trap or Blackburne Trap (also known as Légall Pseudo-Sacrifice and Légall Mate) is a chess opening , characterized by a queen sacrifice followed by checkmate with minor pieces if Black accepts the sacrifice. The trap is named after the French player Sire de Légall. Joseph Henry Blackburne, a British master and one of the world's top five players in the latter part of the 19th century, set the trap on many occasions.

Natural move sequence
There is a number of ways the trap can arise; the one below shows a natural move sequence from a simultaneous exhibition in Paris. André Cheron, one of France's leading players, won with the trap as White against Jeanlose:

1. e4 e5 2. Nf3 Nc6 3. Bc4 d6 
The Semi-Italian Opening.

4. Nc3 Bg4
Black pins the knight in the fight over the center. Strategically this is a sound idea, but there is a tactical flaw with the move.

5. h3 
In this position 5.Nxe5 would be . While the white queen still cannot be taken (5...Bxd1) without succumbing to a checkmate in two moves, 5...Nxe5 would win the white knight (for the pawn) and protect the bishop on g4. Instead, with 5.h3, White "puts the question" to the bishop which must either retreat on the c8–h3 diagonal, capture the knight, be captured, or as in this game, move to an insecure square.

5... Bh5 (diagram)
Black apparently maintains the pin, but this is a tactical blunder which loses at least a pawn (see below).

6. Nxe5
The tactical refutation. White seemingly ignores the pin and surrenders the queen. Black's best course now is to play 6...Nxe5, where with 7.Qxh5 Nxc4 8.Qb5+ followed by 9.Qxc4, White remains a pawn ahead, but Black can at least play on. Instead, if Black takes the queen, White has checkmate in two moves:

6... Bxd1
 Winning the queen but losing the game. Black should have played 6...Nxe5 or 6...dxe5 as mentioned in the previous note.

7. Bxf7+ Ke7 8. Nd5
The final position is a pure mate, meaning that for each of the eight squares around the black king, there is exactly one reason the king cannot move there, and exactly one reason why the king cannot remain on its current square.

Légal versus Saint Brie
The original game featured Légal playing at rook odds (without Ra1) against Saint Brie in Paris 1750:

1. e4 e5 2. Nf3 d6 3. Bc4 Bg4?! 4. Nc3 g6? 5. Nxe5 Bxd1?? 6. Bxf7+ Ke7 7. Nd5# 

The above version is cited in most publications, sometimes with the move 4... h6 instead of 4... g6. Also the year 1750 is assumed to be wrong; it is more likely that the game was played in 1787, and that the original move order was:

1. e4 e5 2. Bc4 d6 3. Nf3 Nc6 4. Nc3 Bg4 5. Nxe5? Bxd1?? 6. Bxf7+ Ke7 7. Nd5# 1–0
Here the combination is flawed, as with 5... Nxe5 Black could have gained a piece. It is reported that Légal disguised his trap with a psychological trick: he first touched the knight on f3 and then retreated his hand as if realizing only now that the knight was pinned. Then, after his opponent reminded him of the touch-move rule, he played Nxe5, and the opponent grabbed the queen without thinking twice.

Other variations

Considerations
A mating pattern where a pinned knight moves, allowing the capture of the player's queen but leading to a checkmate with minor pieces, occasionally occurs at lower levels of play, though masters would not normally fall for it. According to Bjerke (Spillet i mitt liv), the Légal Trap has ensnared countless unwary players. One author writes that "Blackburne sprang it several hundreds of times during his annual tours."

In general, setting up a "trap" by luring a bishop into a queen capture is not strictly necessary. Any game featuring an advanced knight and Bxf7+ (or ...Bxf2+) followed by mate with minor pieces would be considered a Légal Mate.  The mate succeeds because the square of the advanced knight is unguarded, and the enemy king is blocked by several of its own pieces.

See also
 Checkmate pattern
 Elephant Trap

References

Bibliography

External links
 Kermur Sire De Legal vs Saint Brie, Paris, 1750 at Chessgames.com

Chess traps
Chess checkmates
18th century in chess